Jovan Isailović Sr. (1756-1825) was a Serbian icon and mural painter who lived and worked in the late eighteenth century and early nineteenth century. In 1772 he started painting an iconostasis in the Church of St. George in Sombor with fellow painters Teodor Kračun and Lazar Serdanović. The iconostasis in the Serbian Orthodox Monastery of Saint George, better known as Sveti Đurađ monastery in Romanian Banat, is also linked to Jovan Isailović Senior, dating from 1803 to 1804, and presenting a strong Byzantine influence. Isailović Senior also worked with his colleague painter Janko Halkozović. Many of the iconostasis and icons attributed to him were pillaged during World War II.

See also
 List of painters from Serbia
 Serbian art

References 

18th-century Serbian painters
18th-century male artists
19th-century Serbian painters
Serbian male painters
Serbian icon painters
Muralists
1756 births
1825 deaths
Place of death unknown
Place of birth unknown
19th-century Serbian male artists